Gutolactone is a chemical compound extracted from Simaba guianensis and it has displayed antimalarial properties in vitro.

References 

Quassinoids